Chloreuptychia agatha is a species of butterfly in the family Nymphalidae. It is found in Colombia, Ecuador, and Brazil (Amazon region).

References

Butterflies described in 1867
Euptychiina
Nymphalidae of South America
Taxa named by Arthur Gardiner Butler